Star Test may refer to:
Standardized Testing and Reporting in schools
Star Test (TV series), a British TV programme